The Premio 40 Principales for Best Chilean Act is an honor presented annually at Los Premios 40 Principales from 2007 to 2011. It was then discontinued due to the creation of Los Premios 40 Principales América, reemerging in 2014 as part of them.

References

2011 music awards